{{DISPLAYTITLE:C3H4O4}}
The molecular formula C3H4O4 (molar mass: 104.06 g/mol) may refer to:

 Glycerol carbonate, a cyclic carbonate ester
 Hydroxypyruvic acid, a pyruvic acid derivative
 Malonic acid, a dicarboxylic acid
 Tartronic acid semialdehyde, the uronic acid of glyceraldehyde
 Monomethyl oxalate, a compound that cannot be isolated but is an intermediate in synthesizing or hydrolyzing dimethyl oxalate